Mannelli is an Italian surname. Notable people with the surname include:

Caesar Mannelli (1897–1936), American rugby union player
Carlo Mannelli (1640–1697), Italian violinist, castrato and composer
Francesco Mannelli (c. 1595 – 1667), Italian Baroque composer, particularly of opera, and theorbo player
Luca Mannelli (circa 1265 - 1364) classicist and archbishop
Luigi Mannelli (born 1939), Italian water polo player
Massimo Mannelli (born 1956), Italian golfer
Maurizio Mannelli (1930–2014), Italian water polo player
Riccardo Mannelli (born 1955), Italian artist and illustrator
Ugolino Mannelli

See also
Manelli

Italian-language surnames